Deh Now-e Khonj (also Romanized as Deh Now-ye Khonj; also known as Deh Now, Deh Now-e Konj, and Dehnow Khanj) is a village in Tang-e Narak Rural District, in the Central District of Khonj County, Fars Province, Iran. At the 2006 census, its population was 250, in 38 families.

References 

Populated places in Khonj County